The , is a Japanese battle rifle used exclusively by the Japan Self-Defense Forces and the Japanese Coast Guard. It is a gas-operated, selective fire weapon which is chambered for the 7.62×51mm NATO round and uses a detachable 20-round box magazine.

The Type 64 has never been exported due to Japan's strict anti-hardware export laws. It has been superseded by the more advanced Howa Type 89 from 1989 to 1990, but is still in service with all branches of the Self-Defense Forces and the Japanese Coast Guard. A small number of Howa Type 64 marksman versions have been used by the Special Armed Police unit.

History
Roughly a decade after the creation of the Japanese Self Defense Forces, the Defense Agency decided to make a domestically designed and manufactured main battle rifle to replace the aging M1 Garand rifles that had been given to them by the United States.

It was developed by Howa Heavy Industries and eventually was produced in large numbers beginning in 1964 under the direction of General Kenzo Iwashita, who had a hand in designing the rifle. The Type 64 was given official trademark rights in 1964 on behalf of Howa with the rights granted in 1966.

Production was completed in 1988. As of 2020, the patent trademark has officially expired.

When compared to the M14 rifle for testing purposes, it was found to be superior in practical accuracy, likely because its rate of fire and recoil (from special reduced powder charge 7.62 NATO ammunition) were lower. However, it has had consistent problems during its service life due to its reportedly overcomplicated construction and is plagued by a false (yet pervasive) reputation for shedding parts during field use and overall unreliability.

Scandal
The JGSDF's Ōita Prefecture garrison had encountered supply problems when they were not able to account for 30 Howa Type 64s that had been lost, despite a massive search conducted by 95,000 soldiers on January 24, 2007.

Development
The Japanese Defense Agency conducted research on which rifle the JGSDF should adopt to replace the M1 Garands in service. In response, Howa worked on creating prototype rifles for the JDA to examine.

The first prototypes, known as the R1 and R2, are based on the shape and features of the Armalite AR-10. Another prototype, known as the R3, is based on the M14 with a curved magazine. From feedback, another prototype known as the R63E was used as the basis for developing the Type 64.

Design
The selector switch on the Type 64 is one of its most famous features due to the manner and order in which it is labeled: first ア (アンゼンソウチ/安全装置/Safety device (Safe)), then タ (タンシャ/単射/Semi), and finally レ (レンシャ/連射/Auto). Together, they spell アタレ (Atare); atare in Japanese means "Hit the target".

The weapon's stock was equipped with a hinged buttplate in order to improve accuracy during full-auto fire. The Type 64 has an external gas regulator to control cyclic rate.

The iron sights consist of a flip-up rear aperture and post configuration, a surprisingly modern feature for the era. The rear sight, consisting of a disk aperture atop a squared housing for the circular range adjusting disk. This is located at the rear of the receiver, with short protective wings for when it is flipped down. The front sight is located at the front of the weapon by the gas block, and has a seemingly adjustable front post flanked by straight, almost vertical protective wings, curving out slightly.

The magazine capacity is limited to 20-rounds of 7.62×51mm NATO ammunition. A notable feature of the cartridge used in this weapon is that the powder charge is reduced by about 10%, to reduce its inherently excessive recoil and muzzle climb. It was purposely produced with a reduced powder charge to be more suitable to the Japanese physique. The Type 06 rifle grenade can be used by the Type 64. To use it, the gas regulator needs to be used to cut off gas to the piston.

Because it was designed around this specialized cartridge, the rifle incurs substantially accelerated wear and tear from using full-powered ammunition. Still, the gas regulator has a setting to accommodate normal 7.62×51mm NATO ammunition.

The rifle has an empty magazine hold-open for the bolt, meaning that the bolt will stay open upon expending a magazine. But with the lack of a proper bolt hold-open device, the bolt slams forward upon removal of an empty magazine, much like the Yugoslavian Zastava M70 rifle series. The gas and bolt system is inspired by the FN FAL or the SVT-40.

Variants

Designated Marksman
Long range optics (scopes) can be installed on the Type 64 rifle so it can be deployed as a sniper rifle. Issuing a Type 64 sniper rifle is usually granted to the individual with the most accurate shooting proficiency in each division (a designated marksman). However, in many cases the individual may simply be issued the scope by itself to be used only during training exercises and shooting competitions, while no specific rifle is assigned to the individual himself.

The issued optics are usually set at 2.2× magnification and may either be a surplus M1C/D sniper rifle M84 scope used by the U.S. Military during World War II or a similar model produced by Nikon that replicates the M84's magnification levels. Performance is similar to the M1C/D sniper rifle but it is only possible to set the scope to view targets at 500 meters despite the elevation knob being labeled for up to 800 meters. In addition to this, the standard aiming reticule is a simple black "T"  which makes it extremely difficult to use during twilight hours or on a black target.

Some serious complaints about the accuracy of the sniper version are linked to the poorly conceived attachment system for the scope. The scope goes askew easily because it is only affixed with one screw. After the scope is mounted and the rifle is zeroed, it is imperative that it be handled carefully because it is easily jostled. Furthermore, since the scope is not usually assigned to any particular rifle it is often difficult to keep it static on any particular rifle's receiver. This is usually corrected by installing a piece of cloth between the receiver and scope mount, but then the iron sights of the rifle are obscured. In cases like this, it is necessary to install a cheek pad to properly align the users eye with the scope.

The weapon has been phased out in front line units of the Ground Self-Defense Force as it was replaced with the M24 Sniper Weapon System, introduced in 2002 to J.G.S.D.F service.

Gallery

References

Bibliography
 7,62-мм автоматическая винтовка М64 (Япония) // Вооружение и техника. Справочник / колл. авт., под общ. ред. А. В. Громова. 2-е изд. М., Воениздат, 1984. стр.17-18

External links

 Official JGSDF Page
 Official HOWA Page

7.62×51mm NATO battle rifles
7.62×51mm NATO semi-automatic rifles
Rifles of the Cold War
Cold War weapons of Japan
Rifles of Japan
Designated marksman rifles
Weapons and ammunition introduced in 1964